Gemma Joan Dashwood, OAM (born 19 October 1977) is an Australian Paralympic swimmer, medical doctor and ordained Deacon in the Anglican church.  She was born in Canberra. She competed in the Les autres disability category due to her septic arthritis.

Swimming career
She won three gold medals at the 1996 Atlanta Games in the Women's 100 m Butterfly S10, Women's 400 m Freestyle S10, and Women's 4 × 100 m Freestyle S7-10 events, for which she received a Medal of the Order of Australia. At the same Games, she won two silver medals in the Women's 100 m Freestyle S10 and Women's 200 m Medley SM10 events. At the 2000 Sydney Games, she won a gold medal in the Women's 400 m Freestyle S10 event, a silver medal in the Women's 200 m Medley SM10 event, and a bronze medal in the Women's 4 × 100 m Freestyle 34 pts event.

She had an Australian Institute of Sport scholarship from 1995 to 2000. In 1997, she moved to Newcastle to study speech therapy at the University of Newcastle and trained under Bill Nelson. She became a member of the University of Newcastle Swimming Club, where she practiced for the Sydney 2000 games. She organised the 'Swimming in Parallel Calendar 2000' to raise the profile of the Australian female Paralympic swim team. In 2000, she received an Australian Sports Medal.

Medical career

Dashwood graduated from Canberra Girls' Grammar School in 1995. She moved to Newcastle, New South Wales to study speech pathology at the University of Newcastle. After completing her degree, she worked in England. She returned to Canberra in 2004 and enrolled in the inaugural Australian National University Medical School class and graduated in 2007. In 2009, she completed her internship with ACT Health. She has worked as an intensive care registrar at Canberra Hospital, Ipswich Hospital, Queensland and Wesley Hospital (Brisbane).

Dashwood is a highly regarded amateur musician, playing the organ and cello and singing, and plays the cello with the Australian Doctors' Orchestra.

Dashwood has a long standing involvement with the Anglican  Church. She plays organ at St Paul's Ipswich and sings at St John's Cathedral (Brisbane). She was ordained Deacon in December 2020 and is currently honorary Deacon at the Parish of Goodna.

References

Female Paralympic swimmers of Australia
Swimmers at the 1996 Summer Paralympics
Swimmers at the 2000 Summer Paralympics
Medalists at the 1996 Summer Paralympics
Medalists at the 2000 Summer Paralympics
Paralympic gold medalists for Australia
Paralympic silver medalists for Australia
Paralympic bronze medalists for Australia
Les Autres category Paralympic competitors
Recipients of the Medal of the Order of Australia
Recipients of the Australian Sports Medal
Australian Institute of Sport Paralympic swimmers
Sportspeople from Canberra
Sportswomen from the Australian Capital Territory
Australian National University alumni
University of Newcastle (Australia) alumni
Australian intensivists
1977 births
Living people
Paralympic medalists in swimming
Australian female freestyle swimmers
Australian female butterfly swimmers
Australian female backstroke swimmers
S10-classified Paralympic swimmers